Oodle, Inc. is an online marketplace based out of San Mateo, California. It was founded in 2004 by ex-Excite executives Craig Donato, Scott Kister and Faith Sedlin.

Overview
Oodle is currently the largest classifieds aggregator, and aggregates listings from sites like eBay, ForRent.com, BoatTrader.com, as well as local listings from local newspapers and websites.

Oodle strongly encourages posters to include a Facebook profile with listings, believing that users will prefer the transparency of dealing with someone with a name and face attributed to their listing.

Oodle also powers other companies' classifieds websites, from the online classifieds for traditional newspapers including The Sun, The Washington Post Express, New York Post to other large websites like AOL, Lycos, Local.com, Military.com, to non-traditional classifieds hosting sites like Wal-Mart.  Oodle searches vertically in the classifieds categories of cars, real estate, renting, jobs, personals, merchandise, tickets, pets and services.

Oodle aggregates listings from national and local sources, covering over 1000 regions in the United States, UK, Canada, Ireland, and India

History 
On March 6, 2009, Facebook launched a now defunct version of its Marketplace application powered by Oodle. In November 2010 Oodle acquired Grouply, a platform for building custom social networking groups. The QVC home shopping company purchased Oodle in 2012. In May 2015, the site was purchased from QVC by Oodle Holdings.

Third party resources 
Oodle provides its classifieds content for publication on external websites through the use of an API or simpler JavaScript Widget.

Partner listings 
Websites supply their classified ad listings to Oodle in the form of XML or CSV files which Oodle parses into their database for redistribution.  Oodle currently has over 75,000 partner listings. FreeAdsTime is one of the ad suppliers of Oodle.

See also
 Employment website

References

External links
 

Online marketplaces of the United States
Privately held companies based in California
QVC
Internet properties established in 2005